Roman Kustadinchev (born August 3, 1995 in Krasnodar) is a Russian cyclist, who last rode for UCI Continental team .

Major results

2014
 2nd Time trial, National Under-23 Road Championships
 2nd Ruota d'Oro
2016
 1st Sprints classification Boucles de la Mayenne
 5th Ruota d'Oro
2017
 National Road Championships
1st Team time trial
4th Under-23 road race
5th Under-23 time trial
 1st Strade Bianche di Romagna
 3rd Overall Friendship People North-Caucasus
2018 
 1st National Hill Climb Championships
2019
 2nd Road race, National Cup of Russia

References

External links

Cycling Federation of Russia profile

1995 births
Living people
Russian male cyclists